The British Rail Class 109 is a class of 2-car diesel multiple units built in 1957 by D Wickham & Co. Five two-car units were built featuring an unusual body design. The design, first used in 1936 for South American railways, aimed to minimise weight. It had no underframe, but the whole body was formed into a welded stress-bearing box girder made of  solid drawn steel tube. Aluminium was used for panels, luggage racks, window frames, vacuum pipes and fuel and vacuum tanks. The corrugated steel floor was filled with sprayed asbestos and covered with asbestos-filled flame-proofed hardboard and rubber sheet.

The units soon became non-standard and two were sold back to the manufacturer who exported them to Trinidad and Tobago.  Another unit was converted into departmental service, and survived in BR ownership until the early 1980s.

Vehicle numbers

Further use 
One two-car set (50416+56171) was extensively overhauled in 1967 at Doncaster, revamping the interiors and adding kitchen facilities to 50416. After repainting, the set was used as the ER General Managers special train, numbered 975005 / 975006.

Preservation 
One two-car unit, (see above) the former departmental unit, formed of vehicles 50416 and 56171, has been preserved and restored to working condition at the Llangollen Railway. It was restored using lottery money.

References

External links 
 https://web.archive.org/web/20051029135601/http://www.railcar.co.uk/his100-109/109intro.htm

109
D. Wickham and Company rolling stock
Train-related introductions in 1957